Hex River Poort Pass is a mountain pass situated in the Western Cape, province of South Africa on the National N1 between Worcester and De Doorns.

See also
 Hex River Mountains
 Hex River Tunnels

Mountain passes of the Western Cape